David Elliott (born 1947) is an American author of children's books in verse and prose. He taught creative writing, adolescent literature and playwriting at Colby-Sawyer College in New London, New Hampshire from 1998 to 2013. He also served as their director of International Student Services.=

Work 
David Elliott grew up in Ohio and wrote his first story when he was 16 and sent it to The New Yorker magazine.  He recalls that it was returned to him torn in half.

Many of his children's books are humorous stories in verse and prose. On the Farm and its successors are sets of pithy poems about the natural world. Bull is a verse novel for young adults retelling the myth of the Minotaur. Voices is a novel in medieval verse looking at Joan of Arc's life from various points of view.

Bibliography
The Transmogrification of Roscoe Wizzle (2001)
And Here's to You! (2004, illustrated by Randy Cecil)
One Little Chicken: A Counting Book (2007, illustrated by Ethan Long)
Jeremy Cabbage and the Living Museum of Human Oddballs and Quadruped Delights (2008)
Knitty Kitty (2008, illustrated by Christopher Denise)
What the Grizzly Knows (2008, illustrated by Max Grafe)
Wuv Bunnies From Outers Pace (2008, illustrated by Ethan Long)
Finn Throws a Fit (2009, illustrated by Timothy Basil Ering)
Nobody's Perfect (2015, illustrated by Sam Zuppardi)
Baabwaa and Wooliam (2017, illustrated by Melissa Sweet)
Bull (2017)
Voices: The Final Hours of Joan of Arc (2019)

Evangeline Mudd series
Evangeline Mudd and the Golden-Haired Apes of the Ikkinasti Jungle (2004, illustrated by Andréa Wesson)
Evangeline Mudd and the Great Mink Escapade (2006, illustrated by Andréa Wesson)

Hazel Nutt series
Hazel Nutt, Mad Scientist (2003, illustrated by True Kelley)
Hazel Nutt, Alien Hunter (2004, illustrated by True Kelley)

Nature series
On the Farm (2008, illustrated by Holly Meade)
In the Wild (2010, illustrated by Holly Meade)
In the Sea (2013, illustrated by Holly Meade)
On the Wing (2014, illustrated by Becca Stadtlander)
In the Past (2018, illustrated by Matthew Trueman)

The Cool Crazy Crickets series
The Cool Crazy Crickets Club (2010, illustrated by Paul Meisel)
The Cool Crazy Crickets to the Rescue (2010, illustrated by Paul Meisel)

This Orq. series
He Cave Boy (2014, illustrated by Lori Nichols)
He Say "Ugh!" (2015, illustrated by Lori Nichols)
He #1 (2016, illustrated by Lori Nichols)

References

External links

 
 

American children's writers
Children's poets
Colby–Sawyer College faculty
Writers from New Hampshire
People from Warner, New Hampshire
1947 births
Living people